Sardar Sher Ali Gorchani is a Pakistani politician who served as Deputy Speaker of Provincial Assembly of the Punjab from June 2013 to May 2018. He was a Member of the Provincial Assembly of the Punjab from 2008 to May 2018.

Early life and education
He was born on 17 May 1980 in Dera Ghazi Khan.

He completed his graduation in 2006 from Multan and has a degree of Bachelor of Arts.

Political career
He was elected to the Provincial Assembly of the Punjab as a candidate of Pakistan Muslim League (N) (PML-N) from Constituency PP-247 (Rajanpur-I) in 2008 Pakistani general election. He received 24,392 votes and defeated a candidate of Pakistan Muslim League (Q). He served as Parliamentary Secretary for Colonies and Consolidation from 2008 to 2013.

He was re-elected to the Provincial Assembly of the Punjab as a candidate of PML-N from Constituency PP-248 (Rajanpur-II) in 2013 Pakistani general election. In June 2013, he was elected as deputy speaker of the Provincial Assembly of the Punjab.

In 2018, he was allocated PML-N ticket to contest the 2018 Pakistani general election from Constituency NA-193 and from Constituency PP-293, however he refused to take party ticket.

References

Living people
Baloch politicians
Punjab MPAs 2013–2018
1980 births
Pakistan Muslim League (N) MPAs (Punjab)
Punjab MPAs 2008–2013
People from Dera Ghazi Khan District
Deputy Speakers of the Provincial Assembly of the Punjab
Gorchani family